The British Baseball Federation (BBF) is the national governing body of baseball within the United Kingdom. Organised modern baseball has been played in the United Kingdom since the first baseball league began in 1890, with a succession of different governing bodies in place over that time. The BBF was founded in 1987.

The BBF is a federated member of both the Confederation of European Baseball and the International Baseball Federation. Until December 2020, the BBF was a joint member (with the British Softball Federation) of BaseballSoftballUK (BSUK), a sports development agency. 

The voting members of BBF are the affiliated baseball clubs, life members and the umpires, scorers and coaches associations. The BBF holds an annual general meeting each spring at which the voting members elect an executive board of 11 officials to oversee the body and the sport. All participants (players, coaches, managers, umpires, scorers, etc.) with affiliated clubs and the associations are members of the BBF.

There are organised youth leagues at 10 to 13 (Bronco) and 14 to 16 (Pony) age ranges. Additionally, British Baseball supports the Play Ball programme run by BaseballSoftballUK which introduces children from 8 to 12 to bat and ball games, usually through school or a local Play Ball scheme. There are also GB national teams for youth players (Cadets under 16s, and Juniors under 19s), as well as an off-season British Baseball Academy for youth players and coaches. For adults, there are a number of leagues and divisions, split by ability and geographical location. These range from the highly competitive to the recreational.

In 2008 there were 38 clubs, with 67 league teams, as members of the BBF. There are also a number of non-league clubs and teams affiliated to British Baseball. British Baseball also oversees the national team of Great Britain.

BBF Board
The BBF board is elected at AGMs.  The current board is comprised as follows:
President: Tom Thornhill
Treasurer: -VACANT-
Secretary: Earl Dix
Senior Affiliated Clubs League Commissioner: Chris Carter
National Team Programme Official: Erik Gustafson
Coaches Commissioner: -VACANT- 
Youth Commissioner: Kent Boswell
Officials: Chris Deacon

Past Presidents 
Ian Cox: 2004–06
Ian Marchment: 2006–07
Rob Rance: 2007–09
Mark Salter: 2010–12
Earl Dix: 2014–16
Gerry Perez: 2016-21

League structure
Affiliated clubs may enter as many teams as they wish to play in the BBF baseball leagues. There is a senior bracket for adults, and two youth brackets (10 to 13 and 14 to 16).

The season runs from April to September each year and ends in the National Baseball Championships (previously referred to as 'Final 4s').  National Youth Baseball Championships are also held for the two youth-age brackets Bronco (U13) and Pony (U16). Championships are hosted by different clubs around the country each year chosen through a competitive bidding process.

See also
British Baseball Hall of Fame
Baseball in the United Kingdom
Baseball awards#United Kingdom
Baseball World Cup
Sheffield Bladerunners
Bolton Robots of Doom

References

External links
British Baseball Federation
BaseballSoftballUK - the dual sports' development agency
Great Britain National Baseball Team
CEB Confederation of European Baseball
IBAF International Baseball Federation

Baseball governing bodies in Europe
Baseball in the United Kingdom
Baseball
Sports organizations established in 1987
1987 establishments in the United Kingdom